Sara Ann Lee (June 7, 1992 – October 5, 2022) was an American television personality and professional wrestler, best known for her time in WWE. In 2015, she was the female winner of the sixth season of the WWE competition Tough Enough.

Early life 
Sara Ann Lee was born on June 7, 1992 in Saginaw, Michigan and raised in Hope Township, Michigan. She spent time in competitive powerlifting. She graduated from Meridian High School in 2010, and went on to study diagnostic medical sonography at Delta College in Bay City, Michigan.

Professional wrestling career 
In June 2015, Lee was one of the 13 finalists for the sixth season of the WWE competition Tough Enough. After being at risk of elimination five times throughout the course of the competition, on August 25, Lee was chosen by fan vote as one of the winners, along with Josh Bredl, earning a $250,000 one-year contract with WWE. During the final, Lee adopted the ring name Hope and lost a singles match to Alicia Fox.

In September, Lee was assigned to WWE's developmental territory NXT, based at the WWE Performance Center in Orlando, Florida, to begin training. Returning to her real name, Lee made her first appearance for NXT at a live event on January 16, 2016, when she delivered a heel promo. She made her in-ring debut at the January 30 live event during a six-Diva tag team match, which also involved fellow Tough Enough competitor Mandy Rose. On September 30, 2016, Lee was released from her WWE contract.

Personal life 
Lee married former WWE wrestler Wesley Blake on December 30, 2017. They had three children.

Death 
Lee died on October 5, 2022, at the age of 30. Her cause of death has not been revealed.

Championships and accomplishments 
 WWE
 Tough Enough VI – with Josh Bredl

See also
List of premature professional wrestling deaths

References

External links 
 
 
 

1992 births
2022 deaths
Tough Enough winners
American female professional wrestlers
Professional wrestlers from Michigan
21st-century American women
21st-century professional wrestlers
Sportspeople from Saginaw, Michigan